Banjo is a 2016 Indian Hindi-language musical action drama film , directed by Ravi Jadhav and produced by Krishika Lulla under the banner of Eros International. Principal photography began at the end of January 2016 and the film was released on 23 September 2016. Riteish Deshmukh and Nargis Fakhri starred in the film. The film received mixed reviews upon its release and was declared a flop at the box office.

Plot
Mickey (Luke Kenny) is an American, temporarily based in Mumbai, who is in search of an instrumentalist capable of playing the (Indian) banjo. While trying to contact his music festival aspirant friend Christina (Nargis Fakhri), he comes across a local concert organised by a band of poor friends: five of them, led by Taraat (Riteish Deshmukh), who, unknown to Mickey, is the right match for him and Christina to show up at the festival. Christina, upon arrival in Mumbai, is forced to seek out odd jobs and portray Mumbai as dirty, but when, through a local MLA, she meets Taraat, who falls in love with her at first sight, she begins recognising the city as a good place. Taraat is at loggerheads with the leader of an underpaid rival band, who frames him wrongly for the assassination of the MLA who had introduced Taraat to Christina. By that time, in a twist of fate, Christina, while trying to chase the sounds of a banjo being perfectly played, discovers it is Taraat, and convinces him.

Following the assassination, Taraat is disowned by his friends, who accuse him of committing a crime, under what is obviously a false impression. However, when the rival band's lead musician admits his mistake, the friends get back together. Finally, they are given a chance by popular music baron Shamin Nair (Mohan Kapoor). However, shortly after Christina returns to the States, Nair humiliates Taraat, who threatens Nair and dares him to steal the show. When the band makes an entry, Nair is convinced of the band's power as it plays a sway-away song based around Lord Ganesha. Finally, after Mickey sends a recording of the song to Christina, Taraat is contacted by her to come to the US for attending the festival.

Cast

 Riteish Deshmukh as Nandkishore/Taraat
 Nargis Fakhri as Christina/Chris
 Dharmesh Yelande as Grease
 Aditya Kumar as Paper
 Ram Menon as Vajya
 Mahesh Shetty as Pakkaya
 Luke Kenny as Mickey a.k.a. Mic
 Mohan Kapoor as music baron Shamin Nair
 Anand Ingale

Reception

Critical response
Banjo received mixed reviews from critics. The Times of India rated the film 3.5/5, writing that "If you are familiar with Mumbai's working-class neighbourhoods, where the hearts of the poor are bigger than the pay packages of those residing in the mushrooming high-rises, you'll be able to notice the beauty of Banjo. It also makes you respect the street musicians a little more." Hindustan Times rated the film 3/5, stating that "there's a lot to like in Riteish Deshmukh film." Koimoi.com rated the film 2/5, writing that "Banjo is easily passable. Why would you waste your money to watch Nargis’ acting and Riteish juggling between his Lai Bhaari an Rockstar character. Rediff.com rated the film 2/5, writing that it has "nothing much to beat about." NDTV rated the film 1.5/5, writing that "Riteish Deshmukh's film is a pale shadow of Rock On!!." The Indian Express rated the film 0.5/5, writing that "Riteish Deshmukh, Nargis Fakhri film has no redeeming features."

Box Office

India
The film's first weekend produced a net collection of 5.92 crore. In the next four days, the film collected 2.03 crore, which took its first week collection to a total of 7.95 crore.

Overseas

Soundtrack

The background score for the film was composed by Sourav Roy. The soundtrack album of Banjo consists of seven songs composed by Vishal–Shekhar with lyrics written by Amitabh Bhattacharya. The music rights are acquired by Eros Music. The first song of the film "Bappa" was released on 18 August 2016.
The Song "Bappa" and  "Om Ganapataye Namah Deva" become most popular songs in Ganesh Utsav in 2016. The full music album was released on 23 August 2016.Even today, this film is remembered on the performance of Ritesh Deshmukh.

See also
ABCD (franchise)

References

External links
 
 

2010s Hindi-language films
2016 films
2016 action drama films
2010s musical drama films
Films shot in Mumbai
Indian action drama films
Indian musical drama films
Films shot in New York (state)
Films about musical groups
Films directed by Ravi Jadhav